"Blame It on the Weatherman" is a song by Irish girl group B*Witched, written by Ray "Madman" Hedges, Martin Brannigan, Tracy Ackerman, and Andy Caine. It was released as the fourth single from their self-titled debut studio album on 15 March 1999.

Like the other three singles from the album, "Blame It on the Weatherman" reached number one on the UK Singles Chart. With this, B*Witched became the first act ever to have their first four singles all debut at number one in the UK (a record since beaten by fellow Irish band Westlife) and today remain the only girl group to do so. In Ireland, it reached number eight, while in New Zealand, it became the group's first single to miss the top 10, stalling at number 29. The song was certified silver in the UK with sales of 200,000.

Music video
The music video was directed by Michael Geoghegan. It features B*Witched floating on a large upside-down articulated lorry through the flooded city of London, picking up numerous floating items from the water and also rescuing a puppy. For the video, the band wore a mixture of their trademark denim and leather, designed by Scott Henshall, who then dressed them for their Royal Variety Performance in 1999.

Track listings

UK CD1
 "Blame It on the Weatherman" – 3:33
 "Together We'll Be Fine" – 3:18
 "Blame It on the Weatherman" (orchestral version) – 3:31

UK CD2
 "Blame It on the Weatherman" (original) – 3:33
 "Blame It on the Weatherman" (Amen Club Mix) – 7:10
 "Blame It on the Weatherman" (Chicane vocal edit) – 5:01

UK cassette single
 "Blame It on the Weatherman" – 3:33
 "Blame It on the Weatherman" (orchestral version) – 3:31

European and Australian CD single
 "Blame It on the Weatherman" – 3:33
 "Together We'll Be Fine" – 3:18
 "Blame It on the Weatherman" (Amen Club Mix) – 7:10
 "Blame It on the Weatherman" (Chicane vocal edit) – 5:01

Credits and personnel
Credits are lifted from the B*Witched album booklet.

Studio
 Produced in Ray "Madman" Hedges' Mothership

Personnel
 Ray "Madman" Hedges – writing, production, arrangement
 Martin Brannigan – writing, arrangement
 Tracy Ackerman – writing
 Andy Caine – writing
 Erwin Keiles – guitar
 Anne Dudley – string arrangement

Charts

Weekly charts

Year-end charts

Certifications

Release history

References

1998 songs
1999 singles
B*Witched songs
Epic Records singles
Music videos directed by Michael Geoghegan
Song recordings produced by Ray Hedges
Songs about weather
Songs written by Martin Brannigan
Songs written by Ray Hedges
Songs written by Tracy Ackerman
UK Singles Chart number-one singles